Lingga may refer to:

 Lingga, Malaysia, a small town in Sarawak, Malaysia
 Lingga (state constituency)
 Lingga Regency a group of islands in Indonesia
Lingga Island
 Lingga, Simpang Empat, Karo Regency, Indonesia

See also

Linga (disambiguation)
Johor Sultanate, sometimes known as Johor-Riau-Lingga, 1528–1855
Riau-Lingga Sultanate, 1824–1911